The Women's 100 metre x 4 medley at the 2014 IPC Swimming European Championships was held at the Pieter van den Hoogenband Swimming Stadium, in Eindhoven from 4–10 August.

As with other disability medley events, the freestyle works on a points system whereby the classification numbers of each swimmer are totaled to give a number no higher than 34.

Medalists

See also
List of IPC world records in swimming

References

freestyle medley 100 m women
2014 in women's swimming